"Tu y yo" is a song by Kendji Girac released in 2016.

Charts

References 

2016 songs
2016 singles
French-language songs
Kendji Girac songs